Álvaro Bermejo Marcos (born 1959) is a Spanish writer.

Álvaro Bermejo Marcos was born on 1 August 1959 in San Sebastián. He won the Ateneo de Sevilla prize in 2001 for La piedra imán. In 2008, he won the Ateneo de Novela Histórica prize for Un pez en el Tíbet.

Publications

1998: El reino del año mil
2001: La piedra imán
2008: Un pez en el Tíbet

References

1959 births
Living people
Autonomous University of Barcelona alumni
Spanish male writers
University of Deusto alumni